Steamboat Island is an island in southern Puget Sound. Located at the opening of the Totten Inlet, the area lies at the northern end of a peninsula known locally as the "Steamboat Peninsula".

History
Founded in 1909, Steamboat Island was named by local settlers who thought the island resembled a steamboat. The peninsula and island is contained within the Griffin School District and is served by the Griffin Fire Department #13 and is also known locally as the "Griffin area" of Thurston County, Washington.

Demographics
The population is mostly Caucasian and largely made of two person households.

Parks and recreation
The island is about  due west from Hope Island Marine State Park, which is accessible only by boat.

References

External links
 The Griffin Neighborhood Association
 Hope Island Marine State Park website

Islands of Puget Sound
Landforms of Thurston County, Washington